Paul Stinckens (born 25 June 1953) is a Belgian sprint canoer who competed from the early 1970s to the early 1980s. He won two medals in the K-2 10000 m event at the ICF Canoe Sprint World Championships with a silver in 1974 and a bronze in 1973.

Stinckens also competed in three Summer Olympics, but did not advance to the finals in any event he competed. Stinckens' best finish was fourth in the semifinal round twice (K-4 1000 m: 1972, 1976).

Following his athletic career Stinckens founded the company "Unicorn Group" in Overpelt (Belgium), focussing on corporate professional training with outdoor team and leadership development seminars.

References

Sports-reference.com profile
Unicorn Group website

1951 births
Belgian male canoeists
Canoeists at the 1972 Summer Olympics
Canoeists at the 1976 Summer Olympics
Canoeists at the 1980 Summer Olympics
Living people
Olympic canoeists of Belgium
ICF Canoe Sprint World Championships medalists in kayak